Serge Yao N'Guessan (born 31 July 1994) is an Ivorian professional footballer who most recently played as a midfielder for French club AS Nancy.

International career

International goals
Scores and results list Ivory Coast's goal tally first, score column indicates score after each N'Guessan goal.

References

External links

1994 births
Living people
Association football midfielders
Ivorian footballers
Ivory Coast international footballers
2017 Africa Cup of Nations players
Ligue 1 players
Ligue 2 players
Championnat National 3 players
Academie de Foot Amadou Diallo players
AS Nancy Lorraine players
Ivorian expatriate footballers
Ivorian expatriate sportspeople in France
Expatriate footballers in France
Ivory Coast A' international footballers
2016 African Nations Championship players